The Instituto Vasco da Gama (Institute Vasco da Gama) Goa, today known as the Institute Menezes Braganza, was founded in 1871 on the initiative of Tomás António Ribeiro Ferreira, better known by Tomás Ribeiro, with the aim of promoting and supporting science and Lusophone literature in Goa.

The Instituto Vasco da Gama promoted the golden age of Indo-Portuguese literature, and journalistic interventions besides texts in historiography and poetry.

The institution received  a building from the Portuguese authorities for the setting-up of its headquarters and the necessary financial support for the publication of the Boletim do Instituto Vasco da Gama (Bulletin of the Institute Vasco da Gama), a monthly journal.

After a period of erasure, the Institute was restructured in 1924.

In 1963, after the merger of Goa into India, it has changed its name to  Institute Menezes Bragança, named after Luís de Menezes Braganza, journalist and one of the Goan pioneers of anti-colonialism.

From March 1925, the Instituto Vasco da Gama was attached to the Biblioteca Pública de Goa (public library of Goa).

In, 15 April 1952, it was made a Commander of the Order of Saint James of the Sword (Comendador da Ordem Militar de Sant'Iago da Espada).

References

Commanders of the Order of Saint James of the Sword
Portuguese India
Vasco da Gama, Goa